Benzocyclobutene (BCB) is a benzene ring fused to a cyclobutane ring. It has chemical formula . 

BCB is frequently used to create photosensitive polymers.  BCB-based polymer dielectrics may be spun on or applied to various substrates for use in Micro Electro-Mechanical Systems (MEMS) and microelectronics processing.  Applications include wafer bonding, optical interconnects, low-κ dielectrics, or even intracortical neural implants.

Reactions

Benzocyclobutene is a strained system which, upon heating to approximately 180 °C, causes the cyclobutene to undergo a conrotatory ring-opening reaction, forming  o-xylylene. Since this process destroys the aromaticity of the benzene ring, the reverse reaction is highly favored.

o-Xylylenes generated in this way have been used prolifically in cycloaddition reactions, which restore the aromaticity to the benzene ring, while forming a new annulated species.

Uses
The benzocyclobutene moiety has also appeared in a number of chemical compounds with pharmacological properties such as ivabradine and S33005.   Additionally, the benzocyclobutene analog of 2C-B has been prepared and a benzocyclobutene-derived amphetamine has been patented.

See also 
 Benzocyclobutadiene

References

Polycyclic aromatic hydrocarbons